Sodelglitazar, formerly known as GW 677954, is a thiazole PPARδ receptor agonist developed by GlaxoSmithKline. While it is primarily active at the PPARδ receptor, it is considered a pan agonist with activity at PPARα and PPARγ receptors.

Safety
Phase 2 studies were terminated prior to completion due to safety findings in rodent studies.

See also 
 Elafibranor
 GW0742
 GW501516
 MBX-8025
 Peroxisome proliferator-activated receptor

References 

PPAR agonists
GSK plc brands
Experimental drugs
Trifluoromethyl compounds
Fluoroarenes
Thiazoles
Carboxylic acids